Sabine Plönissen (born 16 January 1995) is a field hockey player from the Netherlands.

Career

Domestic league
In the Dutch Hoofdklasse, Plönissen plays for Amsterdam.

National teams

Under–21
Sabine Plönissen made her debut for the Netherlands U–21 team in 2015 at an invitational tournament in Breda.

Oranje
Following six years outside of high performance programs, Plönissen was named in the Oranje squad for the first time in 2021. She made her international debut in the opening match of season three of the FIH Pro League.

In 2022 Plönissen was named in the Dutch squad for her first major international tournament, the FIH World Cup in Amsterdam and Terrassa.

International goals

References

External links

1995 births
Living people
Dutch female field hockey players
Female field hockey defenders
Amsterdamsche Hockey & Bandy Club players